

Events
Jack Zelig joins Crazy Butch's juvenile street gang as a pickpocket. 
Frank Costello immigrates to the United States with his family to New York from Calabria, Italy.

Arts and literature

Births
Louis Capone, Murder, Inc. hitman
Sylvestro Carolla, New Orleans Mafia leader 
Samuel Stein, Moe Dalitz associate

Deaths

Organized crime
Years in organized crime